Rouketopolemos (Greek Рουκετοπόλεμος, literally "rocket war") is a local traditional event held annually at Easter in the town of Vrontados (Βροντάδος) on the Greek island of Chios. As a variation of the Greek custom of throwing fireworks during the celebration of the service at midnight before Easter Sunday, two rival church congregations in the town perform a "rocket war" by firing tens of thousands of home-made rockets across town, with the objective of hitting the bell tower of the church of the other side.   
The rockets are wooden sticks loaded with a propellant mixture containing gunpowder, and are launched from grooved platforms.

Background
The two rival parishes are St. Marks and Panaghia Ereithiani, the respective churches built on two hilltops about 400 meters away from each other.  
Direct hits on each belfry are supposedly counted on the next day to determine the winner, but each parish invariably claims victory over the other.  The result of this apparent disagreement is that both parishes agree to settle the score next year, and the rivalry is thus perpetuated. The church buildings themselves and the nearby buildings have to be extensively boarded up and protected with metal sheets and mesh for the occasion. Several Vrontadites regularly express their dismay at the explosive nature of the custom, but it is a source of significant tourist revenue for the area.

The origin of this event is unclear, but local tradition holds that it goes back to the Ottoman era. According to local lore it was earlier performed with real cannons, until Ottoman authorities prohibited their use in 1889.

Potential visitors should note that the event is held on Orthodox Easter Day (as defined by the Julian calendar) which falls later in the year than the Easter dates commonly used in the West.

Chronology

The event was temporarily cancelled in 2016, due to complaints by residents for property damage, but was restored in 2017, with limitations on the duration and number of rockets launched.

See also
Chios 
Vrontados

References

On the tradition of Rouketopolomos  Local Newspaper of Vrontados "Omiroupoli" ]
Local tourism website (in Greek)
BBC report
Vrontados rocket-war coverage by Reuters

Easter traditions in Greece
Chios
Greek culture
Annual events in Greece
Fireworks events in Europe
Festivals in Greece
Spring (season) events in Greece